I Should Be with You is the sixth studio album by American country music artist Steve Wariner. It was released on March 7, 1988 by MCA Records. It includes the singles "Baby I'm Yours", "I Should Be With You" and "Hold On (A Little Longer)", which reached #2, #2, and #6, respectively, on the Billboard country charts. The album peaked at #20 on Top Country Albums. "More Than Enough" was recorded the same year by Glen Campbell on Light Years, also produced by Jimmy Bowen for MCA.

Track listing

Personnel
Glen Campbell - background vocals (track 2)
George Grantham - background vocals (tracks 3, 6)
Russ Kunkel - drums (all tracks)
Allyn Love - steel guitar (track 3), dobro (track 4)
Mac McAnally - keyboards (track 7), background vocals (tracks 1, 10)
Mark O'Connor - fiddle (tracks 2-4), mandolin (track 2)
Bill Payne - DX-7 (tracks 1, 2, 5), keyboards (tracks 3, 7, 9), piano (tracks 6, 8, 10)
Leland Sklar - bass guitar (all tracks)
Wendy Waldman - background vocals (tracks 1, 10)
Billy Joe Walker Jr. - acoustic guitar (tracks 3, 4, 6-8), electric guitar (tracks 1, 2, 5, 9, 10), hi-string guitar (track 4)
Steve Wariner - lead vocals (all tracks), background vocals (track 1), acoustic guitar (tracks 1, 2, 4, 5, 7), acoustic guitar solo (track 3), electric guitar (tracks 6, 8-10), electric guitar solo (tracks 1, 6-9)
Terry Wariner - background vocals (tracks 3, 4, 6)
Reggie Young - electric guitar (all tracks)

Chart performance

References

1988 albums
MCA Records albums
Steve Wariner albums